Fischingen is a municipality in the district of Lörrach in Baden-Württemberg in Germany.

References

Lörrach (district)
Baden